Our Lady of Limerick Catholic Church is a historic church building in Glenns Ferry, Idaho. It was built in 1915, and designed in the Gothic Revival and Romanesque Revival architectural styles. It is "a rectangular white brick structure, gable-roofed with a front-to-back ridgebeam and a partially outset steeple/belfry/entry tower centered on the front elevation." It has been listed on the National Register of Historic Places since November 17, 1982.

References

External links

National Register of Historic Places in Elmore County, Idaho
Romanesque Revival church buildings in Idaho
Gothic Revival church buildings in Idaho
Roman Catholic churches completed in 1915
Churches on the National Register of Historic Places in Idaho
20th-century Roman Catholic church buildings in the United States